Falces is a town and municipality located in the province and autonomous community of Navarre, northern Spain. In Basque the town is called Faltzes.  It has a population of around 2500 inhabitants. It is well known for the famous "encierro del pilon", which is a running of the bulls made even more dangerous due to it being run down a narrow road of a steep hill.

The composer Pedro Iturralde was born here.

References

External links
 FALCES in the Bernardo Estornés Lasa - Auñamendi Encyclopedia (Euskomedia Fundazioa) 

Municipalities in Navarre